WMIC (660 AM) is a full service radio station licensed to Sandusky, Michigan at 660 kHz on the AM dial, with a power output of 1,000 watts. WMIC covers Sanilac County, Michigan and The Thumb area of Michigan. The station is owned by Sanilac/GB Broadcasting and broadcasts from studios on Elk Street in Downtown Sandusky, along with sister stations WTGV and WBGV. Its programming is also simulcasted on FM Translator W237EQ, also licensed to Sandusky at 95.3 MHz, with an effective radiated power of 250 watts.

WMIC's transmitter is located south of Sandusky off Cooper Road Road in Sanilac County. WMIC provides a strong signal to both eastern Michigan and western Ontario due to its low dial position and corresponding long wavelength. On clear weather days, the station can be heard as far away as Roscommon, Ann Arbor, and Lansing. The station, however, must sign off at sunset to protect WFAN New York, a 50,000 watt clear channel radio station.

History
WMIC was first granted a construction permit to operate at 1560 kHz on May 10, 1965, and at a thousand watts maximum power.  The station was authorized to operate only from sunrise to sunset, protecting WQXR.  Transmitter facilities were constructed along Cooper Road near M-19, about a mile and a half south of Sandusky.  Shortly before sign-on, the station set up studios at 19 South Elk Street in downtown Sandusky.

The call letters were assigned that October.  Unforeseen delays resulted in extensions being granted, pushing its actual sign-on date to 1968.  Prior to sign-on, the station was granted pre-sunrise authority of 500 watts, which allowed it to sign on two hours before local sunrise, keeping its sign-on time consistent to 6:00am daily. The call letters were previously used by a Defunct radio station in St. Helen, MI.

In 1969, George Benko, a Croswell resident, bought into Sanilac Broadcasting Company.  He and his family still control the station today.

In 1971, WMIC-FM signed on the air, giving Sandusky radio listeners local service after sunset, but this would change six years later, when both entities would separate programming and WMIC-FM would become WTGV.

In 1987, WMIC moved to the stronger dial position of 660 kHz, but retained its same power values and daytime-only status.

In 2021, Sanilac Broadcasting added FM Translator W237EQ 95.3 FM. The addition of this translator allows WMIC to have 24-hour programming for the first time. 95.3 FM is not affected by WFAN New York, and Federal Communications Commission rules allow FM Translators to continue to broadcast, even if their parent station is of daytime only status.

Programming
WMIC features a  full service radio station that consists of syndicated news talk programs weekday afternoons with country music evenings and weekends. 

Eddie Fury, who spent much of his career at Thumb area competitor WLEW-FM, hosts "The Morning Fury" weekdays 6 to 9am.
A country classics show hosted by Paul Osentoski is aired weekdays from 9am-Noon.
Local news and information blocks air weekdays at noon and 5pm.
"Swap Shop" a buy, sell, and trading show from 1 to 2 pm weekdays, and 8 am Saturdays.
Dan Bongino is heard weekday afternoons on tape-delay from 2 to 5pm, his show airs live nationwide from noon to 3pm.  Bongino's show take the place of Rush Limbaugh, who was heard in the same time slot on the station for over three decades.
Additional talk shows including The Jesse Kelly Show and Caravan to Midnight hosted by John B. Wells are heard evenings. America Tonight with Kate Delaney and Captain's America with Matt Bruce is heard overnights.
 On the weekends, the station carries Today's Homeowner with Danny Lipford, Outddor Magazine with Mike Avery, a traditional country music show, and a Polka music show, hosted by Paul Osentoski, a member of the Michigan Polka Hall of Fame.
 Staff list includes reporter and General Manager Bob Armstrong, Assistant Manager Nick Lien, Program Director and Morning Show Host Eddie Fury, News Director Dave Fredrick and Paul Osentoski.

Being a full service radio station, WMIC finds itself in competition with many area radio stations for listeners, including co-owned WBGV which has a 24 hour country format. Port Huron radio stations WSAQ (country) and WPHM (news-talk) compete with WMIC from the south. Other Thumb area stations with similar formats include WLEW in Bad Axe and WKYO in Caro.

References

External links
Michiguide.com - WMIC History

MIC
Country radio stations in the United States
Sanilac County, Michigan
Radio stations established in 1968
1968 establishments in Michigan
MIC